The Hwasong-15 is an intercontinental ballistic missile developed by North Korea. It had its maiden flight on 28 November 2017, around 3 a.m. local time. It is the first ballistic missile developed by North Korea that is theoretically capable of reaching all of the United States' mainland.

Tests

November 2017 test
Immediately after the launch, many analysts assumed that a Hwasong-14 had been fired; subsequently, however, the North Korean government released video of the launch showing a completely different missile.

North Korea claimed the missile reached an altitude of around 4,475 km and traveled 950 km downrange, flying for a total time of 53 minutes. Based on its trajectory and distance, the missile would have a range of more than 13,000 km (8,100 miles) – more than enough to reach Washington D.C. and the rest of the United States, albeit, according to the Union of Concerned Scientists, probably with a reduced payload. Several important US allies, including the United Kingdom and France, also lie within the missile's theoretical range, which covers most of Earth's land masses except South America, the Caribbean, and the majority of Antarctica.

The different densities of different casing materials and explosive mechanisms (e.g. metallic-based conventional explosives tend to be several times heavier than a corresponding volume of organic explosives) make accurately estimating warhead payload based on images alone very difficult, if not impossible. Based on the limited information available, the Union of Concerned Scientists did conclude that equipping the missile with a normal-sized payload would likely reduce the overall range.

It was the first launch after a 10-week break.

According to a statement by Japanese Minister of Defence Itsunori Onodera, the missile's re-entry vehicle failed to successfully re-enter the Earth's atmosphere, breaking apart and crashing into waters within Japan's exclusive economic zone.  Later assessments from the Union of Concerned Scientists, however, raised questions as to whether the object Onodera described may have been the missile's detached first stage, not its re-entry vehicle.

February 2023 test
KCTV reported that the test was conducted on 18 February at Pyongyang International Airport under a sudden order by the Chairman of the Central Military Commission of the Workers' Party of Korea which was issued at 8:00 AM on the same day.

It was reported that the missile traveled up to a maximum altitude of 5,768.5 km and flew 989 km for nearly 67 minutes before striking at its target in open waters of the East Sea of Korea. The country rated this test as "Excellent" in the assessment.

Design

Engine
According to international weapons analysts, the Hwasong-15 first stage has a gimbaled two-chambered main engine system, as opposed to the Hwasong-12 and Hwasong-14 which have one fixed main chamber and four gimbaled steering vernier thruster chambers.

The second-stage engine for the Hwasong-15 was test-fired on June 23, 2017.

According to missile specialist Norbert Brügge, the missile uses the ‘Paektusan, 백두산’, the first stage of the two stage missile uses an RD-250 clone liquid propulsion system developed by Pyongyang, comprising two combustors fed by common turbopump to increase takeoff thrust. The new propulsion is estimated to have 170 percent increase in thrust, compared to the Hwasong-14.

Warhead
He noted major differences in the design of the actual Hwasong-15 and the missile he visualized the day before, from the dimensions to two nozzles/engine instead of one, such as on the Hwasong-14.

Analysts have noted that the re-entry vehicle has a blunter nose than previous designs, which can accommodate a larger diameter warhead and reduces re-entry stress and heating at the cost of accuracy. Some analysts think it may be able to carry additional payloads such as decoys or even multiple warheads.

Launch vehicle

The 9 axle Transporter erector launcher (TEL) vehicle is larger compared to the 8 axle TEL vehicle of the Hwasong-14. However, just like the Hwasong-14, the launch footage indicates the missile was fired from a fixed launch pad, not from the vehicle.

See also
2017–2018 North Korea crisis

References

Intercontinental ballistic missiles of North Korea
Military equipment introduced in the 2010s
Weapons of mass destruction